A list of Western films released in the 1970s.

TV series of 1970s
see, List of TV Westerns

References

1970
Western